Prosobothrium is a genus of flatworms belonging to the monotypic family Prosobothriidae.

Species:

Prosobothrium adherens 
Prosobothrium armigerum 
Prosobothrium japonicum

References

Cestoda
Cestoda genera